To eat humble pie, in common usage, is to  face humiliation and subsequently apologize for a serious mistake. Humble pie, or umble pie, is also a term for a variety of pastries based on medieval meat pies.

The expression derives from umble pie, a pie filled with chopped or minced offal, especially of deer but often other meats. Umble evolved from numble (after the Middle French ), meaning "deer's innards". 

Although "umbles" and the modern word "humble" are etymologically unrelated, each word has appeared with and without the initial "h" after the Middle Ages until the 19th century.  Since the sound "h" is dropped in many dialects, the phrase was hypercorrected as "humble pie".  While "umble" is now gone from the language, the phrase remains, carrying the fossilized word as an idiom.

See also 
 Eating crow

References

External links

 Umble pie at The Foods of England
 Traditional English Diets

Offal
British pies
English-language idioms
Metaphors referring to food and drink